Luke Donnelly (born 20 January 1996) is a Scottish footballer who plays as a striker for Alloa Athletic. Donnelly began his career as a youth player for Celtic and has since played for East Stirlingshire, Morton, Queen's Park, Stranraer, Arbroath and is in his second spell with Alloa.

Club career
Born in Glasgow, Donnelly started his career with Celtic playing regularly for their development side.

Donnelly moved on a two-month loan to East Stirlingshire in November 2014, which was later extended until the end of the season.

On 21 May 2015, he scored Celtic's third goal in a 5–2 victory against Rangers as they won the 2014–15 Scottish Youth Cup.

On 26 August 2016, Donnelly joined Alloa Athletic on loan. He made his debut the following day as a substitute and scored in a 4–0 victory against Albion Rovers. Donnelly then joined Greenock Morton on loan in February 2017, for the remainder of the season.

After leaving Celtic at the end of the 2016–17 season, Donnelly signed as an amateur for Scottish League One side Queen's Park for the 2017–18 season.

In the summer of 2018, Donnelly signed for Stranraer. In January 2019, he then moved to Arbroath signing an eighteen-month contract.

Donnelly returned to Alloa Athletic on 31 August 2022.

Career statistics

References

External links

1996 births
Living people
Association football forwards
Celtic F.C. players
East Stirlingshire F.C. players
Alloa Athletic F.C. players
Greenock Morton F.C. players
Queen's Park F.C. players
Stranraer F.C. players
Arbroath F.C. players
Scottish Professional Football League players
Footballers from Glasgow
Scottish footballers